The Think Tanks and Civil Societies Program (TTCSP) was a non-profit program at the University of Pennsylvania in Philadelphia, Pennsylvania, that operated from 1989 to 2021. TTCSP was originally established at the Foreign Policy Research Institute in 1989. The director was James McGann. The program conducted research on policy institutes around the world, and maintained a database of over 8,200 think tanks from across the world.

Program history
The TTCSP was established at the Foreign Policy Research Institute in 1989. It began with its focus on think tanks in the US. In the 1990s, the program became increasingly global as a result of the political and economic transformation that took place in Central and Eastern Europe. R. Kent Weaver of the Brookings Institution and James McGann of the Foreign Policy Research Institute were asked to help conceptualize what became the Global Development Network, a World Bank sponsored conference in Barcelona, Spain. This resulted in the publication Think Tanks and Civil Societies: Catalysts for Ideas and Action in 2000. In 2008, the TTCSP moved to the International Relations Program at the University of Pennsylvania.

Global Go To Think Tank Index
McGann and the Program published the annual Global Go To Think Tank Index. As of 2010, the Index is based on a three-phase survey whose participants include politicians, scientists, think tank donors, and think tanks. However, this method of the study and assessment of policy institutes has been criticized by researchers such as Enrique Mendizabal and Goran Buldioski, Director of the Think Tank Fund, assisted by the Open Society Institute.

In 2018, this Index listed USA the country with the largest number of Think Tanks (1871), followed by India (509), China (507), UK (321), Argentina (227), Germany (218), Russia (215), France (203), Japan (128), Italy (114), Brazil (103), Canada (100), South Africa (93).

See also
 List of think tanks

References

External links
 Think Tanks and Civil Societies Website
  – provides information on the Foreign Policy Research Institute (FPRI), including scholar bios and works published.
  – provides information on the Think Tanks and Civil Societies Program, including history and background, program goals, research priorities, and publications.
  – a biography of James McGann, Director of the Think Tanks and Civil Societies Program.
  – a biography of R. Kent Weaver, Senior Fellow at the Brookings Institution
   – provides information on the Global Development Network, including its mission, history, research priorities, and publications.
 International Relations Program at the University of Pennsylvania
 
 

Think tanks based in the United States
University of Pennsylvania